Jana Schimke (born 6 September 1979) is a German politician of the Christian Democratic Union (CDU) who is a member of the Bundestag, the German federal parliament (federal election 2021).

Early life and career
Schimke was born in Cottbus, Germany. A political scientist, she worked as an intern in the Bundestag from 2002 to 2006. She also worked for the Confederation of German Employers' Associations (BDA) from 2008 until 2013.

Political career
At the general election in September 2013, Schimke unexpectedly gained the constituency of Dahme-Spreewald – Teltow-Fläming III – Oberspreewald-Lausitz I from the Social Democratic Party. From 2013 to 2021, she served on the Committee on Labor and Social Affairs, where she was her parliamentary group's rapporteur on temporary employment and the situation in the East German states. In addition to her committee assignments, she is the chairwoman of the German-Spanish Parliamentary Friendship Group. Within the CDU/CSU, she is a member of MIT, its pro-business wing.

Since 2015, Schimke has been serving as deputy chairwoman of the CDU in Brandenburg, under the leadership of chairman Ingo Senftleben. In 2019, she was appointed by the Federal Ministry of the Interior, Building and Community to serve on the committee that oversaw the preparations for the 30th anniversary of German reunification.

Since 2021, Schimke has been serving as chairwoman of the Committee on Tourism.

Other activities

Regulatory agencies
 Federal Network Agency for Electricity, Gas, Telecommunications, Post and Railway (BNetzA), Alternate Member of the Advisory Board

Corporate boards
 Michels Kliniken, Member of the Advisory Board

Non-profit organizations
 German Red Cross (DRK), Brandenburg Chapter, Member of the Presidium
 McDonald’s Kinderhilfe Stiftung, Member of the Board of Trustees

Political positions
Schimke was one of only five CDU parliamentarians who voted against the government’s draft law on introducing a national minimum wage for the first time in Germany’s history in July 2014.

Ahead of the Christian Democrats’ leadership election in 2018, Schimke publicly endorsed Friedrich Merz to succeed Angela Merkel as the party’s chair.

In 2020, Schimke opposed plans to introduce a mandatory quota aimed at achieving equal representation of women within the CDU’s regional and national governing bodies by 2025.

Recognition
Following her election, Schimke was named "Miss Bundestag" in poll conducted by BILD newspaper in 2013.

Personal life
At the time of her election, Schimke was living with her partner in Nuthetal.

References

External links
 Homepage of Jana Schimke

1979 births
Living people
Members of the Bundestag for Brandenburg
Female members of the Bundestag
People from Cottbus
21st-century German women politicians
Members of the Bundestag 2021–2025
Members of the Bundestag 2017–2021
Members of the Bundestag 2013–2017
Members of the Bundestag for the Christian Democratic Union of Germany